KTBC may refer to:

KTBC (TV), the Fox owned-and-operated station for Austin, Texas
KLBJ (AM), a radio station in Austin, Texas, which previously held the KTBC call sign
KLBJ-FM, a radio station in Austin Texas, which previously held the KTBC-FM call sign